Budapesti Vasutas Sport Club-Zugló is a professional football club based in Zugló, Budapest, Hungary, that competes in the Nemzeti Bajnokság III. 
The club was founded in 1911. Its football section became closed in 2001, but has now reopened, while other sections that are still operational are table tennis, wrestling, water polo. The table tennis department won the European Cup of 1980 and several national championships.

The football team reached in the years 1996 and 1997 twice the Hungarian Cup final and was runner up in the national championship in 1996.

History
On 18 July 2012, BVSC started an adult team after 10 years of pause. The team are going to compete in the Budapest Labdarugó Szövetség IV.

In 2019, the club were promoted to the Budapest bajnokság I after winning the 2018-19 Budapest bajnokság II.

In May 2020, the club were promoted to the Nemzeti Bajnokság III after finishing first in the Budapest championship. The 2019-20 Budapest Bajnokság I was interrupted and finally terminated due to the COVID-19 pandemic. Gábor Horváth, director of the football department, said that the club were eligible to enter the 2020-21 Nemzeti Bajnokság III and the club would meet all the requirements to play at the third tier.

On 28 July 2021, former Hungarian national team player, Ákos Buzsáky, was appointed. The main aim of the club was to get promoted to Nemzeti Bajnokság II.

In the 2020-21 Nemzeti Bajnokság III season, the club finished second.

In March 2022, the club announced that refugees from the Russo-Ukrainian War can do sports for free at the club.

On 1 June 2022, Ákos Buzsáky was removed from his position.

On 22 June 2022, Flórián Urbán was appointed as the new manager of the club.

Name changes

As most other Hungarian sports clubs BVSC was subject to numerous changes of its name throughout its history. Here is a list of names that were in use by the club:

1911–1945 MAVOSZ Budapesti VSC
1945-? Vasutas Előre SC (after merger with Budapesti MÁV Előre)
?-1948 MÁV Konzum Vasutas Előre
1948–1954 Budapesti Lokomotív SK
1954-1956 Budapesti Törekvés SE (after merger with Budapesti Előre SK and Budapesti Postás SK)
1956-1990 Budapesti VSC (after demerger of Budapesti Előre SK and Budapesti Postás SK)
1990-1991 BVSC-Mávtransped
1992-1992 BVSC-Novép
1992-1996 BVSC-Dreher
1996-1997 Budapesti VSC
1997-1998 BVSC-Zugló FC
1998-1999 BVSC-Zugló
1999-2001 Budapesti VSC
2001-2011 BVSC-Zugló FC
2011- BVSC-Zugló

Players

Current squad

Non-playing staff

Management

Honours
 Hungarian League:
 Runners-up (1): 1995–96
 Hungarian Cup:
 Runners-up (2): 1995–96, 1996–97

Seasons

Managers

  Péter Szabó (1951–1952)
  Béla Kállói (1953)
  István Baráth (1953–1954)
  Tivadar Király (1954)
  László Fenyvesi (1955–1957)
  László Balogh (1957)
  Ede Moór (1957–1960)
  Gábor Kiss (1960–1961)
  Jenő Stahl (1961)
  László Fenyvesi (1961–1962)
  László Keszei (1962–1963)
  János Gyarmati (1964–1968)
  Ferenc Szigeti (1969–1970)
  Béla Marosvári (1970–1973)
  György Mezey (1973–1977)
  Mihály Vasas (1977)
  Mihály Ubrankovics (1978–1981)
  András Borbély (1981–1982)
  Antal Szentmihályi (1982–1983)
  László Halácsi (1983–1985)
  József Farkas (1985–1986)
  József Both (1987–1988)
  István Kisteleki (1988–1992)
  József Both (1992-1993)
  Imre Garaba (1993)
  Sándor Egervári (1993–1996)
  László Dajka (1996–1997)
  György Mezey (1997)
  György Bognár (1997–1998)
  István Sándor (1998)
  Dragan Sekulić (1999)
  József Tajti (1999)
  Tibor Simon (1999–2001)
  József Dzurják (2001–2002)
  Tamás Futó (2003–2004)
 there were no professional team (2004–2012)
  András Hernády (2013–2015)
  Ákos Balogh (2015–2017)
  László Varga (2017–2018)
  Gabala Krisztián (2018–2020)
  Ákos Buzsáky (2021–2022)

Transfers

In

In Europe

Record by country of opposition
Correct as of 5 July 2010

 P – Played; W – Won; D – Drawn; L – Lost

Notable members in other sports
Gábor Gergely, table tennis world champion
Ferenc Kiss, wrestler, coach with BVSC
László Schell, ice hockey referee, former player

References

External links
 Official site

 
Football clubs in Budapest
Defunct football clubs in Hungary
1911 establishments in Hungary
2001 disestablishments in Hungary
Association football clubs established in 1911